NGC 2067 is a reflection nebula in the constellation Orion.  It was discovered in 1876 by Wilhelm Tempel. It is part of a group of nebulae that also includes Messier 78, NGC 2071 and NGC 2064.

External links 
 The Interactive NGC Catalog Online: NGC 2067
 NASA/IPAC Extragalactic Database: NGC 2067

References

Reflection nebulae
Orion (constellation)
Orion molecular cloud complex
2067